Betty Shannon (née Mary Elizabeth Moore) (April 14, 1922 – May 1, 2017) was a mathematician and the main research collaborator of Claude Shannon. Betty inspired and assisted Claude in building some of his most famous inventions.

Life

Shannon was born on April 14, 1922 in New York City to Vilma Ujlaky Moore and James E. Moore. 
She was awarded a full scholarship to the New Jersey College for Women, where she graduated Phi Beta Kappa after studying mathematics.

She worked as a numerical analyst at Bell Labs, where as a computer she supported work on microwaves, and then on radar. She published her own research on "Composing Music by a Stochastic Process"; an "exceptional" accomplishment in an era when it was a "significant and unusual achievement for a woman to get her name on a research report".

While at Bell Labs she met the shy and insular Claude Shannon. Claude "didn’t have much patience with people who weren’t as smart as he was" and the two of them got on well. In 1948 he asked her on a date and they ended up dining each night together; they were married in 1949.

In addition to her research, Shannon was a member of the Weavers' Guild of Boston, served as Dean of the Guild from 1976 to 1978 and received the Guild's Distinguished Achievement Award.

Shannon had three children, Robert James Shannon, Andrew Moore Shannon, and Margarita Shannon, and raised their family in Winchester, Massachusetts. Her oldest son, Robert Shannon, died in 1998 at the age of 45. Betty died on May 1, 2017 at her home at Brookhaven in Lexington, Massachusetts.

References 

1922 births
2017 deaths
American mathematicians
People from New York City